The 16 Sierra MRT station is a mass rapid transit (MRT) station that will serve the suburbs of 16 Sierra and Pulau Meranti in Puchong, Selangor, Malaysia. It is one of the stations being built as part of the Klang Valley Mass Rapid Transit (KVMRT) project on the Sungai Buloh-Serdang-Putrajaya Line.

Location 
The MRT station were located in southern end of Persiaran Sierra Utara road.

Bus Services 
There are no feeder bus services provided by Prasarana for this MRT station as of now. IOI Properties (the owner of 16 Sierra) also wont provide the shuttle bus service for the 16 Sierra residents.

References

External links
 16 Sierra MRT Station | mrt.com.my
 Klang Valley Mass Rapid Transit
 MRT Hawk-Eye View

Petaling District
Rapid transit stations in Selangor
Sungai Buloh-Serdang-Putrajaya Line